Team Flash is a professional esports organization with FIFA Online 4, Fortnite, and Hearthstone teams competing in Singapore, and Arena of Valor, Free Fire, and League of Legends teams competing in Vietnam. Its Arena of Valor team was the runner-up of the 2018 AOV International Championship, champions of the 2019 AOV World Cup and 2019 AOV International Championship, and five-time winners of the regional Arena of Glory. Its FIFA Online 4 team is a two-time winner of the prestigious EA Champions Cup (EACC), and its League of Legends team competes in the Vietnam Championship Series (VCS), the top-level league for the game in the country.

Team Flash and the Singapore Sports Hub announced on 1 March 2019 that they were entering a talent development partnership and opening Singapore's first esports training facility.

Arena of Valor

History 

Team Flash acquired ProArmy, a team consisting of mostly former GameTV players, for the 2018 Arena of Glory Spring season. After finishing third in the spring season, the team won the following 2018 AOG Winter season, defeating the defending champions Swing Phantom (currently known as Saigon Phantom) 4–1. At the 2018 Arena of Valor International Championship the team made it all the way to the grand finals, after defeating ahq eSports Club and J Team in the quarterfinals and semifinals respectively. However, Team Flash was defeated by J Team in the grand finals and finished runner-up.

In 2019, Team Flash won both the spring and winter seasons of the Arena of Glory. These two victories qualified the team for the World Cup and the International Championship, both of which Team Flash won.

Current roster

FIFA Online 4

History 
In March 2018 Team Flash qualified for the spring season of the EA Champions Cup (EACC) in Bangkok, Thailand, as representatives of Singapore. The roster consisted of Singaporeans Amraan "Amraan" Gani and Fardeen "Fardhino" Hussain, and Malaysian Darren "RippedJean" Gan. The team won the spring cup on 3 April 2018. Prior to this victory, the best finish a Singaporean team had in the EACC was third place. Team Flash won the cup again in November 2018, this time winning the winter cup in Seoul, South Korea.

League of Legends

History 
Team Flash first entered the professional League of Legends scene in November 2011, competing in ESL-sponsored online tournaments in Singapore and the 2011 World Cyber Games. The team's roster was acquired by the Singapore Sentinels in March 2012 and the organization disbanded its League of Legends division. In January 2017 Team Flash acquired the roster of Vestigial with the intention of having them compete in the 2017 spring season of TCL Singapore. However, they were suddenly replaced with the roster of Team Rigel days before roster finalizations. After qualifying for the 2017 spring season of the Garena Premier League (GPL) through TLC Singapore, the roster left the organization.

In late 2018 Team Flash announced a new Vietnam-based team that would compete in the secondary league of the Vietnam Championship Series (VCS), known as VCS B. After defeating Đạt Gaming 3–1 in the second round of 2019 VCS B Spring, Team Flash's roster and promotion tournament spot were sold to QTV Gaming. Team Flash later reentered the professional scene in Vietnam in June 2019, when it announced that it had acquired the roster of Sky Gaming and would compete in the VCS.

Team Flash finished second in the regular season of VCS 2019 Summer, qualifying for playoffs. In the semifinals they defeated long time favourites Dashing Buffalo 3–1, but lost to GAM Esports 0–3 in the finals. After losing 1–3 to Lowkey Esports in the final series of the losers' bracket, Team Flash was eliminated from Worlds' contention.

During VCS 2020 Spring, Team Flash once again finished second in the regular season. This gave them a bye to the second round, where they defeated EVOS Esports 3–1 to qualify for the grand finals. Despite being heavy favourites to win the split, defending champions GAM Esports were defeated by Team Flash in a close series, earning the team their first VCS title.

Team Flash finished second in the regular season yet again during VCS 2020 Summer, earning them a spot in the winners' bracket of playoffs. The team made it all the way to the finals, where they defeated GAM Esports again to claim their second VCS title after another close series.

Current roster

References

External links 
 

2010 establishments in Singapore
Esports teams established in 2010
Esports teams based in Singapore
Esports teams based in Vietnam
Arena of Valor teams
FIFA (video game series) teams
Hearthstone teams
Vietnam Championship Series teams